Sir Henry Cavendish (1550–1616) was the eldest son of the Tudor courtier William Cavendish, and Elizabeth Talbot, Countess of Shrewsbury (c. 1527–1608), known as "Bess of Hardwick". He served in the Netherlands as a captain in 1578, and was the MP for Derbyshire five times, but did not participate greatly in politics. Cavendish was also a notorious libertine, and was disinherited by his mother, who held his wardship after his father's death. After his mother's death in 1608 Cavendish inherited the Chatsworth estate, but he sold it to his brother William, who later became the 1st Earl of Devonshire, in the following year. He had a number of illegitimate children, but no legitimate heirs.

Early life

Henry Cavendish was born in Dec 1550, the eldest son of the politician and courtier Sir William Cavendish and Bess of Hardwick. His father died on 25 October 1557, when the young Henry was only 6 years old. He was raised with his younger brother William at Chatsworth House, which was completed by his mother in the 1560s, where she lived with her fourth husband, George Talbot, 6th Earl of Shrewsbury.

On 9 February 1568, at the age of 17, Cavendish married Grace Talbot, the eight-year-old daughter of his stepfather. The marriage took place in Sheffield, but it was not a happy union and the couple had no children.

Upon attaining his majority, Cavendish received the income from the lands settled upon him by his father, income which had until then gone to his mother, who had been granted his wardship.

Career

Military service
As a young man Cavendish "won repute as a soldier", serving his country as a captain in the Netherlands in 1578, during the Dutch Revolt. Cavendish led a force of around 500 men, mostly from his family estates, successfully fighting off an attack by Spanish tercios led by Don Juan of Austria during the Battle of Rijmenam. War however was costly, and the expense of campaigning in the Netherlands was likely the initial cause of his considerable debts, which amounted to £3,000 by 1584.

Politics
Cavendish entered politics in his early twenties, becoming the Member of Parliament for the County of Derbyshire for over 20 years, returned to office five times in five successive elections, in 1572, 1584, 1586, 1589
and 1593. This remarkable record of success was likely not so much a tribute to his personal qualities than to the influence of his stepfather, the Earl of Shrewsbury.  No reference to him has been found in the Parliamentary journals, suggesting that his actual interest in politics and government was rather limited.

Mary Queen of Scots
In about 1585, Cavendish was living at Tutbury Castle when the Tudor courtier Amias Paulet was making arrangements for Mary Stuart, Queen of Scots to be sent there. Cavendish was reluctant to make way for the royal prisoner, and asked £100 a year for the use of the house, or as an alternative, that Queen Elizabeth I should lend him £2,000 towards the repayment of his debts. Paulet reported to the Queen that "this is his final answer" but added that "It may be, although he doth not say it, that he will be content with the loan of £1,500". Later, however, he befriended the Scottish Queen.

Travels in the East
In 1589, Cavendish went on a trading journey to Constantinople. In his account, which still survives among the Hardwick manuscripts, he described the city of Venice as "a most foul stinking sink".

Personal life
Despite being the eldest son, Cavendish was disinherited by his mother, from whom he had been long estranged. When her marriage to her fourth husband, the 6th Earl of Shrewsbury, fell into difficulties, Cavendish was able to revenge himself upon her by siding with his stepfather against his mother. Bess of Hardwick referred to her eldest son as "my bad son Henry". Instead, his younger brother William, later the First Earl of Devonshire, would inherit those estates his mother controlled.

Unhappy in his marriage, Cavendish pursued extra-marital liaisons, and was popularly known as "the common bull of Derbyshire and Staffordshire". He fathered at least 8 illegitimate children, including 
 Henry Cavendish (1590-1626) 
 Anne (Cavendish) Lowe. 

Bess of Hardwick died on 13 February 1608, and it appears that Cavendish did not attend his mother's funeral. Long estranged, he received nothing from her in her will. However, he did inherit Chatsworth after his mother's death, but he sold the estate to his brother William the following year.

Death and legacy
Cavendish died on 12 October 1616 at Chatsworth, Derbyshire, England. The Cavendish Memorial, a magnificent early-17th-century church monument to Henry and his brother William, can be seen in St Peter's Church, Edensor, Derbyshire, where he is buried.

References
 D. J. B. Trim, ‘Cavendish, Henry (1550–1616)’, Oxford Dictionary of National Biography, Oxford University Press, 2004; online edn, Jan 2008 accessed 25 Sept 2017. This is a subscription site but access is free to readers of British libraries whose library subscribes.
 Dictionary of National Biography (Smith, Elder & Co., 1885-1900) http://search.Ancestry.com.au/cgi-bin/sse.dll?db=dictnatbiogv1&h=83215&ti=5544&indiv=try&gss=pt Death: 1616
 Cavendish, Margaret. The Life of William Cavendish, Duke of Newcastle (John Russell Smith, London, 1872) Page 196-7
 Henry Cavendish at the History of Parliament retrieved 7 August 2018

Notes

1550 births
1616 deaths
English civil servants
Henry Cavendish
Knights Bachelor
English knights
People from Derbyshire Dales (district)
English MPs 1572–1583
English MPs 1584–1585
English MPs 1586–1587
English MPs 1589
English MPs 1593
High Sheriffs of Derbyshire